Moygashel is a small village and townland in County Tyrone, Northern Ireland. It is near the southern edge of Dungannon. Although the village's name is pronounced , the trademark of the Irish linen named after it is pronounced .

People 
One of the bombers killed in the Miami Showband massacre, Wesley Somerville—who was an Ulster Volunteer Force (UVF) and Ulster Defence Regiment (UDR) member—was from Moygashel. He is commemorated by a plaque and banner in the village.

References 

Villages in County Tyrone
Townlands of County Tyrone
Civil parish of Clonfeacle